{{DISPLAYTITLE:B7 polytope}}

In 7-dimensional geometry, there are 128 uniform polytopes with B7 symmetry. There are two regular forms, the 7-orthoplex, and 8-cube with 14 and 128 vertices respectively. The 7-demicube is added with half of the symmetry.

They can be visualized as symmetric orthographic projections in Coxeter planes of the B7 Coxeter group, and other subgroups.


Graphs 

Symmetric orthographic projections of these 128 polytopes can be made in the B7, B6, B5, B4, B3, B2, A5, A3, Coxeter planes. Ak has [k+1] symmetry, and Bk has [2k] symmetry.

These 128 polytopes are each shown in these 8 symmetry planes, with vertices and edges drawn, and vertices colored by the number of overlapping vertices in each projective position.

References
 H.S.M. Coxeter:
 H.S.M. Coxeter, Regular Polytopes, 3rd Edition, Dover New York, 1973
 Kaleidoscopes: Selected Writings of H.S.M. Coxeter, edited by F. Arthur Sherk, Peter McMullen, Anthony C. Thompson, Asia Ivic Weiss, Wiley-Interscience Publication, 1995,  
 (Paper 22) H.S.M. Coxeter, Regular and Semi Regular Polytopes I, [Math. Zeit. 46 (1940) 380-407, MR 2,10]
 (Paper 23) H.S.M. Coxeter, Regular and Semi-Regular Polytopes II, [Math. Zeit. 188 (1985) 559-591]
 (Paper 24) H.S.M. Coxeter, Regular and Semi-Regular Polytopes III, [Math. Zeit. 200 (1988) 3-45]
 N.W. Johnson: The Theory of Uniform Polytopes and Honeycombs, Ph.D. Dissertation, University of Toronto, 1966
 

Notes

7-polytopes